Bellinter House is a large classic country house of Georgian heritage, recently renovated and opened as a 34-room luxury spa hotel. It is in 12 acres of parkland beside the River Boyne in County Meath, Ireland some 10 km (6 miles) from Navan. Bellinter takes its name from the Irish Baile an tSaoir, which means the home of the carpenter.

It is built in a Palladian style with six bays built over three floors (including basement) made of coarse rubble with fine limestone dressings. Adjoining the main part of the building and connected by single story arcades are two storey wings, creating a courtyard. In the grounds are stable block, ice house and other outbuildings.

History
Bellinter House was built in 1750 by Richard Cassels as a country house for wealthy Dublin brewer John Preston in an estate of around 600 acres of grazing and woodland. After John Preston's death the estate passed to John's grandson, John Preston, 1st Baron Tara, Member of Parliament for Navan for 17 years, who died in 1821.

In 1892 the property was bequeathed by John Joseph Preston to Gustavus Briscoe, a family friend and High Sheriff of Meath in 1897, who once rode a horse up the stairs at Bellinter which then refused to come down and had to be winched down three weeks later. In 1907 the property passed to his son Cecil and then George, who in 1955 sold it to the Holdsworth family. It was the residence of the Holdsworth family from 1957 to 1966, when it came into the control of the Land Commission, who sold off most of the land for farming.

After being left vacant for a time, the house itself, with 12 acres of land, became home to the Sisters of Sion.

In 2004 it was sold and transformed into the present hotel by publican and hoteliers Jay Bourke and John Reynolds for €2.3m. It opened in late 2006 after a reputed €16m refurbishment.

In 2016, the house was acquired for €3m by Broadreach Investments, an investment vehicle majority owned by Barry O'Sullivan.

Bellinter House has been determined by the Irish Government Minister for the Environment, Heritage and Local Government as a building that is intrinsically of significant architectural interest for the purpose of section 482 of the TCA 1997.

See also
Ardbraccan House

References

Houses in County Meath
Houses completed in 1750
Hotels in County Meath
Country houses in Ireland
Richard Cassels buildings